is the first anime series produced by Toei Animation (then Toei Doga). The series is known for having more frames per second than other anime of the same time. The series also implemented sponsorship by a large corporation, in this case, Morinaga Candy Company. An English pilot was created to pitch for America but was scrapped. The test pilot featured the voices of Daws Butler and Don Messick.

Plot 
Ken is a young boy who was raised by wolves (similar to Mowgli) in a jungle in the Himalayan Mountains. One day, a meteor hits the jungle, causing a drastic change. This eventually leads to famine and a need for certain animals to relocate. Ken tries to help the animals as much as possible, in particular, he watches over two young wolf cubs named Chichi and Poppo. Jack, a one-eyed wolf, doesn't like Ken as he is a human living among them. One day, Ken saves Jack's life. Jack later has the opportunity to let Ken die when he is bitten by a poisonous snake, but decides to return the favor and save his life instead. This mutual affair causes a friendship to form between the two, and they team up to save the other animals from predators and humans.

Characters 
 Yuuji Nishimoto as Ken
 Kenji Utsumi as Jack
 Hiroshi Masuoka as Kuma
 Hiroshi Ohtake as Black
 Jouji Yanami as Boss
 Kazue Tagami as Chicchi
 Yoko Mizugaki as Poppo
 Keiko Yamamoto as Wally
 Reiko Katsura as Dorothy
 Takuzou Kamiyama as Gorilla

References 

Fictional feral children
Male characters in animation
Male characters in television
Child characters in television
Jungles in fiction
Toei Animation television